Isle Casino Racing Pompano Park, more commonly known simply as Pompano Park, is a standardbred harness racing track and casino in Pompano Beach, Florida. It is billed as "The Winter Home of Harness Racing," as its tropical South Florida location makes it an ideal alternative for horsemen, when most of the racetracks to the north are subject to racing in snow, ice and bitter cold conditions. The track operates its live racing meet for about ten months out of every year, with a short break during the last half of June through the second week in August.

Like most racetracks, Pompano simulcasts horse races from all over the US and Canada, allowing its patrons to wager on racing approximately 363 days per year. Pompano Park is owned and operated by Caesars Entertainment (formerly Eldorado Resorts).

The track has been converted into a racino with slot machines. It currently offers live poker games, under betting limitations imposed by Florida law.

In 2018, Eldorado announced a joint venture with the Cordish Companies to develop the area surrounding Pompano Park with a mixed-use project including retail, dining, office, residential, and hotel elements.

In 2022, it will be renamed Harrah's.

See also
 List of casinos in Florida

References

External links
 

Buildings and structures in Pompano Beach, Florida
Casinos in Florida
Caesars Entertainment
Horse racing venues in Florida
Isle of Capri casinos
Tourist attractions in Broward County, Florida
Companies with year of establishment missing